Plagiosterna is a genus of beetles belonging to the family Chrysomelidae.

Species
The following species are recognised in the genus Plagiosterna:
 Plagiosterna adamsii Baly, 1864
 Plagiosterna aenea (Linnaeus, 1758)
 Plagiosterna maculicollis 
 Plagiosterna nigripes Kimoto, 1969
 Plagiosterna placida

References

Chrysomelinae
Chrysomelidae genera
Taxa named by Victor Motschulsky